Alberto Torrico was elected to the California State Assembly in 2004.  He served for six years, including two years as Majority Leader.

During his three terms in Sacramento, Alberto served as Chair of the Public Employee Retirement and Social Security Committee, charged with oversight of the pension funds, CALPERS and CALSTRS.  He also chaired the Governmental Organization Committee.

In the California Democratic primary of 2010, Alberto ran unsuccessfully for Attorney General.

After being termed out of office, Torrico was appointed to the California Unemployment Insurance Appeals Board in January 2011. Prior to his legislative tenure, Alberto served as a council member for three years in the East Bay community of Newark.

Early life and education
Torrico attended Irvington High School in Fremont, California. Torrico earned his Bachelor of Science degree in political science from Santa Clara University. He went on to earn a J.D. from University of California, Hastings College of Law.

Legal career
Torrico was admitted to the California State Bar in 1996. His career began as a policy aide for Santa Clara County Supervisor Ron Gonzales. He specialized in labor law at Weinberg, Roger & Rosenfield in Oakland and Los Angeles, taught labor and employment law at San Jose City College, and served as senior assistant counsel at the Santa Clara Valley Transportation Authority in San Jose. In 2001, he opened a private law practice in Fremont.

Public service

Newark City Council
Torrico was elected to the Newark City Council in 2001 and later served as Vice-Mayor of Newark.

California State Assembly
Torrico was elected to the California state Assembly in 2004 to succeed termed-out John Dutra. In his second term Torrico was appointed Chair of the Governmental Organization Committee. Torrico was later named Director for Majority Affairs.

References

1969 births
American politicians of Bolivian descent
Living people
Politicians from San Francisco
Santa Clara University alumni
University of California, Hastings College of the Law alumni
American legal scholars
Lawyers from San Francisco
California city council members
Democratic Party members of the California State Assembly
California politicians of Japanese descent
Hispanic and Latino American state legislators in California
American people of Bolivian descent
People from Fremont, California
People from Newark, California
21st-century American politicians